Winteria may refer to:
 Winteria, a monotypic genus of barreleye fishes in the family Opisthoproctidae with the only species Winteria telescopa
 Winteria, a genus of cactuses in the family Cactaceae; synonym of Cleistocactus